John Bruce Cuneo  (16 June 1928 – 2 June 2020) was an Australian sailor and Olympic champion. He competed at the 1972 Summer Olympics in Munich, where he received a gold medal in the dragon class, together with crew members Thomas Anderson and John Shaw. Cuneo sailed on board Southern Cross, the defeated Australian challenger for the 1974 America's Cup. He was educated at the Anglican Church Grammar School.

Cuneo was inducted into the Sport Australia Hall of Fame in 1986 and into the Queensland Sport Hall of Fame in 2009. In 2018 Cuneo, Anderson and Shaw were inducted to the Australian Sailing Hall of Fame. Cuneo died on 2 June 2020, aged 91.

See also
 List of Olympic medalists in Dragon class sailing

References

External links
 
 
 
 

1928 births
2020 deaths
Australian male sailors (sport)
Olympic sailors of Australia
Olympic gold medalists for Australia
Olympic medalists in sailing
Sailors at the 1968 Summer Olympics – Dragon
Sailors at the 1972 Summer Olympics – Dragon
Medalists at the 1972 Summer Olympics
1974 America's Cup sailors
People educated at Anglican Church Grammar School
Recipients of the Medal of the Order of Australia
Sport Australia Hall of Fame inductees
Sportsmen from Queensland
20th-century Australian people